The outer and inner segments of vertebrate retina rod photoreceptor cells contain phosducin, a soluble phosphoprotein that complexes with the beta/gamma-subunits of the guanosine triphosphate-binding protein, transducin. Light-induced changes in cyclic nucleotide levels modulate the phosphorylation of phosducin by protein kinase A. The protein is thought to participate in the regulation of visual phototransduction or in the integration of photoreceptor metabolism. Similar proteins have been isolated from the pineal gland and it is believed that the function of the protein is the same in both retina and pineal gland.

Human proteins containing this domain

References

Protein domains
Protein families
Peripheral membrane proteins